The Critchett Baronetcy, of Harley Street in the Borough of St Marylebone, is a title in the Baronetage of the United Kingdom. It was created on 28 November 1908 for Sir Anderson Critchett. He was Surgeon-Oculist to Edward VII from 1901 to 1910 and to George V from 1910 to 1918 and Surgeon-Oculist-in-Ordinary to George V from 1918 to 1925. The third Baronet was a Counsellor at the Foreign and Commonwealth Office and an officer of the Secret Intelligence Service (MI6).

Critchett baronets, of Harley Street (1908)
Sir (George) Anderson Critchett, Kt., KCVO, 1st Baronet (1845–1925) 
Sir (George) Montague Critchett, MVO, 2nd Baronet (1884–1941)
Sir Ian George Lorraine Critchett, 3rd Baronet (1920–2004) 
Sir Charles George Montague Critchett, 4th Baronet (born 1965)

Notes

References
Kidd, Charles, Williamson, David (editors). Debrett's Peerage and Baronetage (1990 edition). New York: St Martin's Press, 1990,

External links
Picture of Sir Anderson Critchett, 1st Baronet

Critchett